Lons-le-Saunier is a commune and capital of the Jura Department, eastern France.

Geography
The town is in the heart of the Revermont region, at the foot of the first plateau of the Jura massif. The Jura escarpment extends to the east and south, while to the west lies the plain of Bresse and to the north extensive vineyards.

The river Vallière runs through the town, rising in a typical Jura blind valley not far away, at Revigny. It has been conduited since the 1960s on grounds of hygiene, since sewage outlets run into it. A small section remains in the open air near the parc des Bains, and only a single bridge (the pont de la Guiche) remains.

The town is approximately equally placed between Besançon, Dijon, Bourg-en-Bresse and Geneva, though the last of these lies on the other side of the Jura massif. It is served by the A39 autoroute, by which Dijon can be reached in about an hour and Lyon in an hour and a half. The town's railway station lies on the line from Strasbourg to Lyon.

The wine-growing region to the north of the town is particularly well known, and includes the vintages of l'Etoile, Château-Chalon and Arbois.

The Jura escarpment to the south and east is a popular tourist region, with its attractions including the lakes of Chalain, Clairvaux and Vouglans (at Lect, Jura), and mountain resorts such as Prénovel and Les Rousses.

In terms of area, Lons-le-Saunier is the second smallest prefectural town in France, after Bobigny.

History

The brine springs of Lons-le-Saunier have been exploited since the Neolithic. In the 19th century thermal baths were established, of which the monumental Thermes Lédonia have been preserved. In the 19th century there were copper and iron foundries, and a trade in horses, cattle, grain, cheese, etc.

Population

Personalities

Births
 Claude Joseph Rouget de Lisle (1760–1836), composer of La Marseillaise, the French national anthem
 Jean Baptiste Gaspard Roux de Rochelle (1762–1849), ambassador to the U.S.
 Étienne Bobillier (1798–1840), mathematician
 Maurice Joly (1829–78), satirist and lawyer
 René Rémond (born 1918), historian and political economist
 Jeanne Champion (born 1931), French painter and writer
 Guy Canivet (born 1943), judge
 Jean-Claude Romand (born 1954), medical imposter
 Jean-François Stévenin (1944–2021), actor and filmmaker 
 Bernard Clavel (1923–2010), novelist
 Félix Lambey (born 1994), rugby player

Residents
General Claude Lecourbe (1759–1815) studied in Lons; a statue of him stands in the central Place de la Liberté

Twin towns
Lons-le-Saunier is twinned with:
  Offenburg, Germany
  Ripley, United Kingdom

References

External links
 Official website 

 
Communes of Jura (department)
Prefectures in France
Spa towns in France